Kali Nath Roy (1878 – 9 December 1945) was a Bengali nationalist journalist and the Chief Editor of the newspaper The Tribune. His son Samarendra Nath Roy was a mathematician and applied statistician.

Early life
Roy was born in 1878 at Jessore, British India. While studying F.A. in Scottish Church College in Kolkata he joined in anti British movement and left college. He started work as sub editor of Bengali Magazine, edited by Surendranath Banerjee.

Career
In 1911 Roy joined 'The Panjabi' magazine as editor thereafter become the editor-in-chief of the Tribune magazine published from Lahore. He condemned the atrocities of British police and martial law in his column as well as argued for press liberty. Government accused him for publication of seditious writings. Roy was popular for his fearless, brave articles and known as Kali Babu. Mahatma Gandhi praised Roy's political writings in 1932. During the massacre of the Indians at the hands of the British in the infamous Jallianwala Bagh massacre in April 1919, The Tribune published a news report titled "Prayer at the Jama Masjid", on 6 April 1919. For this Roy was sentenced to rigorous imprisonment for two years along with a fine of one thousand rupees. Lahore based Bengali advocate Sudhir Mukhopadhyay pleaded and defended for him in the Court and people collected money to run the case. Even Rabindranath Tagore tried personally for his release.

Death 
Roy's health declined rapidly in the severe winter of Lahore. He left Lahore on 1 December 1945, caught a chill during the journey and died on 9 December 1945 in Kolkata.

References

1878 births
1945 deaths
20th-century Bengalis
19th-century Bengalis
Bengali Hindus
Indian writers
Indian male writers
20th-century Indian male writers
19th-century Indian male writers
20th-century Indian writers
19th-century Indian writers
19th-century Indian journalists
20th-century Indian journalists
Indian journalists
Indian editors
Indian magazine editors
People from Jessore District
Bengali writers
Scottish Church College alumni
Journalists from West Bengal
Journalists in British India